Quiz is a game or puzzle consisting of questions

Quiz may also refer to:

 Quiz (horse), a British thoroughbred
 Quiz (Adelaide newspaper), a former weekly newspaper published in Adelaide, South Australia
 Quiz (clothing), British fashion retailer
 Quiz (play), a 2017 play by James Graham
 Quiz (TV series), a 2020 TV adaptation of the play.